An almshouse is charitable housing that is provided to enable people to live in a particular community.

Specific places named Almshouse include:

Greene County Almshouse, Carrollton, Illinois
Carroll County Almshouse and Farm, Westminster, Maryland
Almshouse (Cambridge, Massachusetts)
Rockland Almshouse, Rockland, Massachusetts
Almshouse (Stoneham, Massachusetts)
Poughkeepsie Almshouse and City Infirmary, Poughkeepsie, New York
Bedford County Alms House, Pennsylvania
Almshouse Farm at Machipongo, Machipongo, Virginia
The Almshouse (Richmond, Virginia)

See also
List of almshouses in the United Kingdom